Langbaan is a Thai restaurant in Portland, Oregon.

Description
Portland Monthly said Langbann as "looks like a foodie's vision of a Bangkok night market". Langbaan has been described as a "restaurant-within-a-restaurant" (PaaDee). PaaDee has also been described as Langbaan's "sibling" restaurant.

History
The restaurant is relocating from southeast Portland to northwest Portland in 2021.

Reception
Michael Russell of The Oregonian described Langbaan as "arguably America's finest Thai restaurant".

See also

 List of Thai restaurants

References

External links
 

Thai restaurants in Portland, Oregon